Olios suavis is a spider species found in Cyprus, Israel and Egypt.

See also
 List of Sparassidae species

References

External links

Sparassidae
Spiders of Europe
Arthropods of Egypt
Spiders of Asia
Spiders of Africa
Spiders described in 1876